Equal Vision Records is an independent record label based in Albany, New York. It was founded in the early 1990s by Ray Cappo, singer for the punk bands Youth of Today, Shelter, and Better Than a Thousand.

The label originally existed solely to distribute Shelter and other Krishna releases. In 1992, label manager Steve Reddy bought Equal Vision from Cappo. The focus was expanded and a wider variety of bands were brought on board. According to Punk News, the mid-to-late '90s saw a redoubling of the Equal Vision's hardcore efforts with such signings as One King Down and Ten Yard Fight. By the end of the '90s Equal Vision Records (EVR) had a stable of hardcore and punk bands, having added Bane, Trial, Converge and Saves the Day to its roster in the latter part of the decade.

Sublabels and distribution
In July 2009 EVR created a sub-label named Mantralogy. This sub-label will feature bands that "deliver edgy, Krishna-conscious music."

In 2012 EVR artist Max Bemis (of Say Anything) created an imprint label named Rory Records, distributed by EVR. On June 19, it was announced that Equal Vision Records and Casey Crescenzo of the Dear Hunter would be forming a partnership. Casey has been given his own imprint label: Cave & Canary Goods.

EVR switched back its distribution of physical and digital releases in the US to RED Distribution since January 23, 2012, after many years with Alternative Distribution Alliance. In May 2013, EVR inked a partnership with UNFD to manufacture, promote and distribute EVR releases in Australia and New Zealand. Prior to the partnership, EVR has shared several artists with UNFD for distribution in both coverages, such as Say Anything, We Came as Romans and House vs. Hurricane.

Velocity Records was originally established in 2009 as a subsidiary of Rise Records. It was relaunched in 2016 as a partner of Equal Vision Records.

Notable artists

Current
 Anberlin
 And So I Watch You from Afar
 Armor for Sleep
 As Cities Burn
 Concrete Castles
 Dead American
 The Dear Hunter (Cave & Canary Goods)
 Destroy Rebuild Until God Shows
 Fairweather
 Gideon
 Hail the Sun
 Hopesfall
 Hot Water Music
 The Juliana Theory
 William Ryan Key
 Donovan Melero
 Museum Mouth (EVR/Rory Records)
 Night Verses (Graphic Nature)
 No Devotion
 Scary Kids Scaring Kids
 Shallow Pools
 Silent Drive
 Two Tongues (EVR/Rory Records)
 The Vaughns

Velocity Records
 And So I Watch You from Afar
 Concrete Castles
 Dead American
 Destroy Rebuild Until God Shows
 Eve 6
 If I Die First
 Nemophila
 No Devotion
 Scary Kids Scaring Kids
 Secrets
 Terror
 Thursday

Former

Mantralogy bands
Gaura Vani & As Kindred Spirits
Jahnavi Harrison
Adam Bauer
The Mayapuris
Arjun Bruggeman
Shyamdas
Suzin Green
SRI Kirtan
Prema Hara
Tulku Sherdor

See also
 List of record labels

References

External links
 
 Mantralogy site
 Punk News

Record labels established in 2008
2008 establishments in New York (state)
New York (state) record labels
Companies based in Albany, New York
American independent record labels
Punk record labels
Alternative rock record labels
Hardcore record labels
Post-hardcore record labels
Experimental music record labels
Equal Vision Records